The Rival of the Empress (Italian: La rivale dell'imperatrice) is a 1951 Italian historical adventure film directed by Jacopo Comin and Sidney Salkow and starring Richard Greene, Valentina Cortese and Isa Pola. A separate English-language version Shadow of the Eagle was released the previous year.

It was shot at the Scalera Studios in Rome with sets designed by Wilfred Shingleton. The costumes were designed by Vittorio Nino Novarese. Star Richard Greene was dubbed by the Italian actor Massimo Serato.

Plot
During the 18th century, the empress of Russia Catherine the Great sends her lover Count Alexei Orloff to kidnap her rival for the throne, the pretender Elizabeth, Princess Tarakanova, from Venice. However, Orloff ends up falling in love with the princess.

Cast
 Richard Greene as Conte Alexei Orloff  
 Valentina Cortese as Principessa Tarakanova  
 Greta Gynt as Contessa Loradona Campaniello 
 Isa Pola as Imperatrice Catarina  
 Charles Goldner as Generale Korsakoff  
 Hugh French as Sergente Sergei Nikolsky
 Antonio Centa as Principe Rasiwill  
 Guido Notari as Vaska  
 Cippi Valli as Cameriera di Elisabetta
 William Tubbs
 Giulio Donnini 
 Dino Galvani 
 Enzo Musumeci Greco

See also
 Princess Tarakanova (1910)
 Tarakanova (1930)
 Princess Tarakanova (1938)
 Shadow of the Eagle (1950)

References

Bibliography
 Alberto Anile. Orson Welles in Italy. Indiana University Press, 2013.

External links

1951 films
1950s historical adventure films
Italian historical adventure films
1950s Italian-language films
Films directed by Sidney Salkow
Films set in Russia
Films set in Venice
Films set in the 18th century
Films about Catherine the Great
Films shot at Scalera Studios
Italian multilingual films
1950s multilingual films
Italian black-and-white films
1950s Italian films